Sabina Margrit Sciubba or Sabina is a singer, composer, and actress. She is best known as the lead singer for the Grammy-nominated electronica band Brazilian Girls. She is also a visual artist. She has a solo career, and also worked as an actress, appearing in a recurring role on the FX series Baskets, beginning in 2016. Sciubba has composed the scores for feature films and commercials.

Early life
Sabina was born in Rome to a German mother and an Italian father. She lived there until age 5, then moved to Germany with her mother, painter Hannelore Jüterbock, and her brother, Christian, where she grew up in Berg, Upper Bavaria.
After living in Italy, Germany and France, Sciubba later lived in New York from 1999 to 2009, before returning to France.
She has commented on her childhood: "I grew up singing to trees, donkeys, sheep and horses, so I suppose there isn't an audience I'm not prepared for."
Sciubba is fluent in six languages: German, Italian, French, English, Spanish and Portuguese. Her father, Enrico Sciubba is Professor for Thermodynamics at the University in Rome, San Pietro in Vincoli, La Sapienza.

Career

Brazilian Girls
Sabina is best known as the frontwoman for the band Brazilian Girls. She stands out because of her unique contralto voice and her signature multilingual storytelling.
She has also been called 'enigmatic' and is noted for her sense of fashion, wearing theatrical outfits often made by herself or by her fashion-designer friends threeasfour, Carolina K, and Gemma Kahng.
In 2008 Sabina composed and sang the songs "Bring Back the Love" and "Os Novos Yorkinos" for Bebel Gilberto's album Momento.
In 2009, Brazilian Girls were nominated for a Grammy Award in the Best Dance/Electronic Album category, but lost out to the band Daft Punk.
In 2009 Sabina and Brazilian Girls member Didi Gutman wrote and produced singer Baaba Maal's album Television, released on Palm Pictures.

The band disbanded in 2019.

Solo career 
Her solo record, called Toujours, was released on February 18, 2014 on Bar None Records and Naim Edge, UK on March 23, 2014.
Sabina's album was welcomed with overwhelmingly positive reviews. 
The Boston Globe reviewer Rebecca Ostriker calls Sabina "a goddess".
Jon Pareles from The New York Times describes her as nonchalant, elusive, sophisticated and resolutely hedonistic. 
Allmusic says "Toujours is an album of true originality, executed with humor, warmth, and spark, and captivating from beginning to end." 
Q magazine calls it "A thoughtful solo debut", Uncut calls Sabina "A Dietrich pour nos jours".
In 2009 Sciubba records the song 'Silence is golden' on Forro in the Dark's album 'Light a candle'.
In 2011, Sciubba sings at the Lincoln Center, premiering 'Goldkind', a musical fairytale composed by Sciubba and Anthony Korf, accompanied by Riverside Symphony.
She also composes and sings on Pretty Good Dance Moves's 2012 album Limo.
On the collaboration project with Big Gigantic in 2012, she appears on the track "Love Letters".

Sabina has composed musical scores for a number of films, including The Party's Over (with Philip Seymour Hoffman) and Forty Shades of Blue, Jimmy in Saigon  amongst others.

In 2019, Sciubba released a new single called "I know you too well", a song featured in the TV series "Baskets" with Zach Galifianakis, and first solo work in 5 years.  
On January 25, 2020 Sciubba premieres her new project "Force Majeure", a crossover between music performance and stage art, performing in a Theatre in Florence, Italy, alongside other musicians, and most notably her shadow (alias Daelen Cory). Her second solo record "Force Majeure", due for release on March 21st 2020, is pushed back because of the COVID-19 emergency, but Sciubba decides to self-release the record on her website, stating: "I named the project Force Majeure since 2018. The fact that the release date happened to be during a major event of Force Majeure, made me feel like it was the perfect time to release it regardless, at least to my closest fans."

Acting
From 2016 until 2019, Sciubba plays a recurring character, Penelope, alongside Zach Galifianakis in the television comedy series Baskets on FX.

Video work
Sabina released a self-produced video for her single 'Toujours' in 2013.
She also made a series of short animated films, which she named Minifilms, which are political comments on human behaviour.

In early April 2014, renowned British artist Oliver Clegg created a video for and with Sabina for the single 'Viva l'amour'. 
The video consists of thousands of hand-drawn images of Sabina.

Discography
 with Antonio Forcione, Meet Me in London, (Naim, 1997)
 with Chris Anderson, You Don't Know What Love Is, (Naim, 1998)
 Brazilian Girls, Brazilian Girls, (Verve, 2005)
 Brazilian Girls, Talk to La Bomb, (Verve, 2006)
 Brazilian Girls, New York City, (Verve, 2008)
 Toujours, (Bar None, Naim, 2014)
 Brazilian Girls, Let's Make Love, (Six Degrees Records, 2018)
 Force Majeure, (Goldkind records, 2020)

Filmography

References

External links

Official website
Sabina's video of the song 'Toujours'
Brazilian Girls on the Dave Letterman show
Brazilian Girls 'Rules of the game' video by Adria Petty

Living people
Italian expatriates in France
Italian people of German descent
Italian pop singers
21st-century German women singers
German jazz singers
21st-century Italian women singers
Year of birth missing (living people)